List of major cities in East Asia.

People's Republic of China

Taiwan

Japan

Mongolia

North Korea

South Korea

Notes and references

East Asia, List of cities